The Dan Vickerman Cup is a rugby union match, initially contested as a one-off match in 2017, and afterwards biannually, in Super Rugby between the ACT Brumbies and the NSW Waratahs. The Dan Vickerman Cup was introduced in 2017 to commemorate Dan Vickerman.

Dan Vickerman
Dan Vickerman was an Australian Rugby Union International Lock. He played over 60 games for Australia, winning the 2011 Tri Nations and a bronze medal at the 2011 Rugby World Cup. He won the 2001 Super 12 title and made the 2002 Super 12 final with the Brumbies, and also made the 2005 Super 12 final and 2008 Super 14 final with the Waratahs.

Vickerman died by suicide in his home on 18 February 2017, at the age of 37 years.

History

Era of Home Field Advantage (1996 – 2010)

Traditionally, the ACT-NSW rivalry was dominated by home victories. Home field advantage was such a powerful factor in these games that the only Brumbies away loss in the 2000 Season was against the Waratahs. Of the sixteen games in the Super 12 and Super 14 eras, the home team won fourteen games. Dan Vickerman played for the winning team in both away victories in this period.

The Brumbies were the first to win two ACT-NSW games in a row, with the 2002 Semi Final and the 2003 regular season game. The 2002 Semi Final was also the first away win in the rivalry, a 51–10 win for the Brumbies at Sydney Football Stadium. The Waratahs had been so comprehensively beaten by the Crusaders the week before that pundits believed the Waratahs would struggle to be in the right state of mind for a semi-final. After winning the game, Brumbies coach David Nucifora agreed that the previous week had "derailed the Waratahs' season". The Brumbies successfully dominated the set piece in the first half but failed to capitalise in open play, only finding success in open play in the second half.

This game was only the fourth time a Super Rugby semi final had been lost by the host, with the Waratahs joining the Reds (1996 and 1999) and the Stormers (1999) in the list of losing hosts, and the Brumbies joining the Crusaders (1999), Highlanders (1999), and Sharks (1996) as winning visitors. Since this time, the Brumbies (2013), Crusaders (2011), Highlanders (2015), and Sharks (2012) have all won semi finals as visitors again, while the Bulls (2013), Stormers (2011 and 2012), and Waratahs (2015) have all lost as hosts.

The Waratahs were the first to win three ACT-NSW games in a row, made possible when they won the first regular season away game in 2005. Waratahs head coach Ewen McKenzie engaged in "mind games" by parking the team bus as an "attack bus" at Brumbies Headquarters all week, mentally "getting in their space". Several Waratahs coaches and players believe this worked for different reasons:
Chris Whitaker, the Waratahs' assistant coach, believed that the "attack bus" worked by getting in the heads of the Brumbies players, while spending an entire week in Canberra allowed the Waratahs players to relax and feel more comfortable. 
Lote Tuqiri, who started on the wing for the Waratahs, believes that playing down the "big brother – little brother" dynamic in the media took some motivation away from the Brumbies players. Jeremy Paul, who started at hooker for the Brumbies, dismissed this view, and believed that the changing dynamic between the teams was a sign that the younger Brumbies players had their own rivalry with the Waratahs, not simply inheriting a rivalry for its own sake.
Peter Hewat, who started on the wing for the Waratahs, recalled that the media in Canberra were more affected by the "attack bus" than the Brumbies players, but that the media then put more pressure on the Brumbies as a result. 
Morgan Turinui, who started at outside centre for the Waratahs, believed that the "attack bus" was more of a metaphor for why they won than the reason, with the Waratahs' tactics to play for possession and "camp in the Brumbies territory".
Tamaiti Horua, who started at number 8 for the Brumbies, believed that the Brumbies' success in 2005 was dependent on how successful they were at keeping the 2004 championship-winning players in the starting lineup. For a variety of reasons, only eight of the fifteen starting players for the Brumbies had started in that position in the 2004 final.

Winning away from home (2011 – 2018)

With the advent of the Super Rugby conference system in 2011, home dominance ceased to be as significant. The first clash in the Super 15 era saw the Waratahs win 29-22 at Canberra Stadium. Both teams had started the season with a good win, but had then fallen into terrible form and embarrassing losses. With the 2011 season being the worst in the Brumbies' history, having fired coach Andy Friend earlier in the month and going into the game with many players missing due to injury, many pundits had picked the Brumbies to lose despite their home field advantage. A try after the siren from Sitaleki Timani, a former Brumby, gave the Waratahs their second ever win in Canberra.

The Brumbies had their revenge the following year, with a 19-15 victory at Allianz Stadium. 

Between the round 12 clash in 2015 and the round 17 clash in 2019, the homes team lost six of the seven games.

Brumbies Ascendent (2019 – Present)

The Brumbies became the second team in Super Rugby history to win 200 games when they beat the Waratahs 24-23 in 2020.

"Mindgames"

 Waratahs head coach Ewen McKenzie, who had played for both teams, infamously invoked "mindgames" by parking the Waratahs' team bus at the Brumbies' headquarters. The distraction paid off, with the "attack bus" getting credit for the Waratahs' 10–6 victory away from home.
 The narrative around the clash was revived in the late 2000s, with the Brumbies nickname of "the Real Madrid of Rugby" cited as originating in the Waratahs camp.
 After the Brumbies' horrific 2011 season, the Waratahs recruited Brumbies star players Rocky Elsom and Adam Ashley-Cooper; these players were subjected to constant booing from the crowd in the 2012 clash in Canberra, as many fans saw the players as either 'traitors' or 'stolen'.
 In 2014, Waratahs Head Coach Michael Cheika broke the door of the visiting Coach's box at Canberra Stadium, with the Brumbies ceremonially sending him the bill.
 Brumby Jack, the mascot for the Brumbies, was refused on-field access by the Waratahs for the 2014 semi final.
 Following further "mindgames" around the timing of naming the starting team, the Brumbies did not release their lineup for the fixture until kickoff in the Round 12 clash in 2015.

Notable players for both teams
Several players have had successful periods playing for both clubs, including:

Updated 25 September 2021. 
Players in bold are still playing for one of the two teams.

Results

All Time Record

Dan Vickerman Cup era
{| class="wikitable"
|align=center bgcolor=#FFE6BD|Brumbies Win
|align=center bgcolor=#9dd7fb|Waratahs Win
|align=center bgcolor=#e0e0e0|Draw
|}

Pre-Dan Vickerman Cup
{| class="wikitable"
|align=center bgcolor=#FFE6BD|Brumbies Win
|align=center bgcolor=#9dd7fb|Waratahs Win
|align=center bgcolor=#e0e0e0|Draw
|}

References

Rugby union rivalries
2017 establishments in Australia
Recurring sporting events established in 2017
Super Rugby
ACT Brumbies
New South Wales Waratahs
Sports rivalries in Australia